The discography of the Sanremo Music Festival winners includes all the winning singles of the annual Festival della Canzone Italiana, an Italian song contest better known as the Sanremo Music Festival, held in the Ligurian city of the same name since 1951 and broadcast by RAI.
As of 2022, the Festival has awarded 72 songs, but from 1953 to 1955, from 1957 to 1971, in 1990 and in 1991, each entry was performed by two different acts, resulting in two different releases for each winning song, for a total of 92 singles.

Between 1959, when the first singles chart was introduced in Italy, and 1996, 21 Sanremo Music Festival winning songs reached the top spot of the Musica e dischi Singles Chart. In the following years, twelve other winning singles topped the official chart compiled by the Federation of the Italian Music Industry since 1997. Some of the winning songs of the Sanremo Music Festival became international hits after being performed at the Eurovision Song Contest, like Domenico Modugno's "Nel blu dipinto di blu", which took third place in the 1958 contest, Gigliola Cinquetti's "Non ho l'età", which won the European competition in 1964, Mahmood's "Soldi", which placed second in 2019, and the 2021 winning song, "Zitti e buoni" by rock band Måneskin.

1951–1959

1960–1969

1970–1979

1980–1989

1990–1999

2000–2009

2010–2019

2020–present

Notes

References